The northern viscacha (Lagidium peruanum) is a species of viscacha, a rodent in the family Chinchillidae. It is known from Peru and Chile, at elevations from 300 to 5000 m, and may also be present in Bolivia.

Description 
Its long ears are furry and its body fur is dense and soft, but the tail has coarser hairs. The dorsal (upper) surface ranges from dark grey at lower altitudes to brown at higher elevations. The ventral (under) surface is cream or pale grey and the tip of the tail is reddish-brown or black.

Distribution and habitat 
The northern viscacha is native to central and southern Peru and northern Chile, and may also be present in the area around Lake Titicaca in Peru and Bolivia. It makes its home in crevices in the rock and is found in various habitats where suitable rocky outcrops are found. Most populations occur between the tree line and the snow line, but the distribution is patchy with the animal being common in some localities and absent in others even though the habitat seems equally suitable.

Behaviour 
The northern viscacha is a herbivore and feeds on a variety of plant material, including grasses, roots, and seeds. Breeding usually takes place during October and November. A litter usually consists of a single pup born after a gestation period around 140 days. The young is weaned when about 8 weeks old.

It is preyed on by the Andean mountain cat (Leopardus jacobitus), the colocolo (Leopardus colocolo), and the culpeo (Lycalopex culpaeus) in high-altitude desert regions. The northern viscacha is more often found on larger, steeper portions of cliffs. This preference is probably driven by a need to avoid predators, as land-based carnivores are more easily evaded on a steep slope. It rarely ventures far from rocks, as these provide a means of escaping from both aerial and terrestrial predators.

Status 
The northern viscacha is common within suitable habitat in its range. The population size is relatively stable, and although it is hunted locally for food, no other significant threats have been identified, so the IUCN lists the species as being of Least Concern in its Red List of Threatened Species.

Gallery

References 

Chinchillidae
Mammals of the Andes
Mammals of Peru
Mammals of Bolivia
Mammals of Chile
Taxa named by Franz Meyen
Mammals described in 1833
Taxonomy articles created by Polbot
Taxobox binomials not recognized by IUCN